Messenger, Messengers, The Messenger or The Messengers may refer to:

People
 Courier, a person or company that delivers messages, packages, or mail
 Messenger (surname)
 Bicycle messenger, a bicyclist who transports packages through cities
 Messenger-at-arms, an officer of the Scottish Court of Session
 Messenger of the Court, a court officer responsible for carrying communications and executing other orders
 Prophets and messengers in Islam
 Muhammad and other prophets in Islam, who were known as Messengers of Allah (God)

Science and technology

Biology and chemistry
 Chemical messenger, such as a hormone or neurotransmitter, a molecule used for cellular signalling
 Messenger RNA (mRNA), RNA that carries information from DNA to the ribosome sites of protein synthesis in a cell

Electronics and computing
Instant messenger, a tool for online text communication
Messenger (software), an instant messaging service by Meta (Facebook)
Microsoft Messenger service, an instant messaging service by Microsoft
Windows Live Messenger, the client for said service, formerly named MSN Messenger
Windows Messenger, a predecessor of the above client
Yahoo! Messenger, an instant messaging service by Yahoo!
Windows Messenger service, a networking component of earlier versions of Microsoft Windows

Space exploration
 MESSENGER, a NASA probe to Mercury launched in 2004

Transport
 Messenger cable, a continuous loop of cable or chain attached to a capstan used to raise the anchor cables on 17th–19th century sailing ships
 Miles Messenger, a British 1940s liaison aircraft
 Messenger (sternwheeler), an 1876 sternwheel steamboat of the Puget Sound Mosquito Fleet
 Verville-Sperry M-1 Messenger, 1921 American biplane
 Messenger (HBC vessel), operated by the HBC from 1897-1906, see Hudson's Bay Company vessels

Literature
 Messenger (novel), a 2004 novel written by Lois Lowry
The Messenger (Silva novel), a 2006 novel by Daniel Silva
The Messenger (Zusak novel), a 2002 novel by Markus Zusak
 The Messenger, a 2001 fantasy novel by Douglas Niles

Periodicals
Fort Dodge Messenger, a newspaper printed in Fort Dodge, Iowa, United States
Messenger (magazine), a Mormon fundamentalist publication
Messenger Newspapers, a group of newspapers in Adelaide, South Australia
The Messenger (astronomy magazine),  a quarterly astronomical journal published by the European Southern Observatory
The Messenger (magazine), a monthly magazine associated with the Harlem Renaissance
Messenger of the Sacred Heart, a Jesuit magazine published in Ireland
The Missionary Messenger, a journal of the British Methodist Episcopal Church in Toronto, Canada
The Messenger (Madisonville, Kentucky), a U.S. newspaper published in Madisonville, Kentucky
The Messenger (Mount Airy, North Carolina), a U.S. newspaper published in Mount Airy, North Carolina
Il Messaggero ("The Messenger"), a newspaper based in Rome, Italy
Messenger, an American magazine published by the Church of the Brethren.
Messenger of Mathematics, a British mathematics journal published between 1872 and 1929, sometimes abbreviated as Messenger

In film and television
 Mohammad, Messenger of God, a 1976 film directed by Moustapha Akkad, chronicling the life and times of the Prophet of Islam, Muhammad
 The Messenger: The Story of Joan of Arc, a 1999 film directed by Luc Besson and starring Milla Jovovich
 "Messenger", an episode of Power Rangers SPD
The Messenger (1918 film), a film starring Oliver Hardy
 The Messenger (1937 film), directed by Raymond Rouleau
The Messenger (1986 film), a 1986 film directed by Fred Williamson
Messengers, a 2004 drama film starring Michele Hicks
The Messenger (2008 film), a film by Çağan Irmak
The Messenger (2009 film), a film by Oren Moverman
 The Messenger (2015 British film), a horror film directed by David Blair
The Messenger (2015 Canadian film), a documentary film directed by Su Rynard
The Messengers (film), 2007 horror film directed by the Pang Brothers
The Messengers (TV series), a 2015 American television series

In gaming
 The Messenger (2001 video game), 2001 adventure game
 The Messenger (2018 video game), 2018 platform game developed by Sabotage

In music
 Messenger Records, a record label
The Messenger, piano composition by Valentyn Sylvestrov

Groups
 The Messengers (producers), a musical songwriting and production duo
 The Messengers Choir, East African gospel group based in the United States
 Paul Kelly and the Messengers, an Australian rock band, active 1987–1992
 Messengers (American band), an American Christian metal band
 Messengers (Scottish band)

Albums
 Messenger (Edwin McCain album), 1999
 Messenger (Jimmy Little album), 1999
 Messenger (Joe Pug album), 2010
 Messengers (album), 2007, by August Burns Red
 The Messenger (Ernest Dawkins album), 2006
 The Messenger (Casey Jones album), 2006
 The Messenger (Kurt Elling album), 1997
 The Messenger (Matt Joe Gow and the Dead Leaves album), 2009
 The Messenger (Johnny Marr album), 2013

Songs
 "The Messenger" (song), by Daniel Lanois
 "The Messenger", by Domine on their 2007 album Ancient Spirit Rising
 "The Messenger", by Linkin Park on their 2010 album A Thousand Suns
 "The Messenger", by Patrick Wolf on his 2009 album The Bachelor
"Messenger", by Blonde Redhead on their 2004 album Misery Is a Butterfly
"Messenger", by Paul McCartney on his 1997 album Standing Stone

Other uses
 Messenger (horse) (1780–1808), an English thoroughbred horse
 Messenger (Plymouth sculpture), a 2018 bronze statue of a female actor in Plymouth, England
 The Messenger (David Wynne sculpture), a 1981 bronze statue of a horse and rider in Sutton, London
 The Messenger (painting), a 1674 painting by Johannes Verkolje

See also

Messenger bag, a type of bag often used by bicycle messengers
 Messenger Feast, a celebration of the Inupiaq and Yup'ik peoples of Alaska
 قاصد (disambiguation), Arabic for messenger